Elliot Fletcher (born June 30, 1996) is an American actor. He is best known for his work in the MTV comedy series Faking It, Freeform's drama series The Fosters, and Showtime's series Shameless.

Early life 
Fletcher was born and raised in Los Angeles, California. He is one of two children born to Julia Fletcher DeMita and John DeMita, who are both voice actors. He has an older brother, Conner DeMita. Fletcher is a trans man who came out shortly after his 17th birthday. He subsequently began using the name Elliot and he/him pronouns.

Career 
Pre-transition, Fletcher voiced Shiro in the English dub of Tekkonkinkreet.

Fletcher joined the cast of Faking It as Noah in early 2016. In April 2016, the media announced that Fletcher would be joining the cast of The Fosters in a recurring guest-starring role as Aaron, an "attractive and intriguing law student" and potential romantic interest of Callie (Maia Mitchell). Fletcher originally considered auditioning for the role of Cole on The Fosters, but decided against it. The role was later filled by Fletcher's close friend Tom Phelan.

Fletcher also appeared in season 7 and then became a recurring cast member in season 8 of the Showtime TV show Shameless. He plays Trevor, a trans man who works for an organization that helps find homes for runaways and homeless LGBT+ teens. He then befriends and gets into a relationship with Ian Gallagher.

In 2017, transgender actors and actresses including Fletcher (with the help of GLAAD and ScreenCrush) were part of a filmed letter to Hollywood written by Jen Richards, asking for more and improved roles for transgender people. In 2019, Fletcher played the character Max in multiple episodes of the third and final season of the Hulu original series Marvel's Runaways.

In 2020, Fletcher was added to the main cast of the post-apocalyptic FX on Hulu show Y: The Last Man. Fletcher's character, Sam Jordan, is a transgender man navigating a world without cisgender men.

Filmography

References

External links 

1996 births
21st-century American male actors
Alumni of Immaculate Heart High School, Los Angeles
American LGBT actors
LGBT people from California
Living people
Male actors from Los Angeles
American male television actors
Transgender male actors